The Salt Lake Stallions were a professional American football franchise based in Salt Lake City, and one of the eight members of the Alliance of American Football (AAF), which began play in February 2019. The Stallions were the northernmost team in the AAF, as the league's only franchise north of the 35th parallel. They played their home games at Rice–Eccles Stadium. The team's head coach was Dennis Erickson, owner of a 179–96–1 record coaching college football and a 40–56 record coaching in the NFL.

On April 2, 2019, the league's football operations were reportedly suspended, and on April 4 the league allowed players to leave their contracts to sign with NFL teams. The league filed for Chapter 7 bankruptcy on April 17, 2019.

History
The Alliance Salt Lake City charter franchise was announced to play at Rice–Eccles Stadium by the Alliance of American Football on May 14, 2018. Dennis Erickson was named by the league as head coach on May 16, 2018. Randy Mueller was named general manager by September 25, 2018.

The western four teams' names and logos were revealed on September 25, 2018, with Salt Lake as the Stallions with the colors of blue, deep sky blue, and silver. The name is inspired by the land speed records set at the Bonneville Salt Flats, while the colors represent aspects of Utah's geography like Great Salt Lake and the Wasatch Range.

The final 52-man roster was set on January 30, 2019. The team's first game was a 38–22 defeat to the Arizona Hotshots at Sun Devil Stadium on February 10, 2019. Their first home game was on February 23, also against the Hotshots and ended in a 23–15 victory.

Final Roster

Allocation pool 
The Stallions had designated rights to players from:

Colleges
 Air Force
 Arkansas
 Boise State
 BYU
 California
 Colorado State
 Dixie State
 Idaho
 Idaho State

 Nebraska
 Northern Colorado
 Northern Illinois
 Oklahoma State
 Oregon
 Southern Utah
 Utah
 Utah State
 Weber State
 Wyoming

National Football League (NFL)
 Denver Broncos
 Green Bay Packers
 Minnesota Vikings
 Seattle Seahawks

Canadian Football League (CFL)
 Calgary Stampeders

Staff

Notable Former Players 

 Matt Asiata - Former Minnesota Vikings Running Back
 Branden Oliver - Former San Diego Chargers Running Back

2019 season

Final standings

Schedule

Preseason

Regular season
All times Mountain

 Changed from original time and network.

Game summaries

Week 1: at Arizona

Week 2: at Birmingham

Week 3: Arizona

Week 4: Orlando

Week 5: at San Diego

Week 6: Memphis

Week 7: at San Antonio

Week 8: San Diego

Media
In addition to league-wide television coverage through NFL Network, CBS Sports Network, TNT, and B/R Live, Stallions' games were also broadcast on local radio by KALL, an ESPN Radio affiliate.

References

Further reading
 

 
2018 establishments in Utah
2019 disestablishments in Utah